Hornadu, also known as Horanadu, is a Hindu holy locale and also a jain holy centerPanchayat village located in kalasa taluk of Chikkamagaluru district, Karnataka, India. The deity at the Annapoorneshwari Temple at Hornadu is Annapurneshwari. The main deity of the goddess was put in place by Adi Shankaracharya; the new deity of goddess Annapurneshwari was consecrated in the temple in 1973. Horanadu has an elevation of

Transport

Horanadu lies amidst Malnad at a distance of 95 km from Chikkamagalur,126 km from Mangaluru,126 km from Shivamogga  and 316 km from Bengaluru. Distance from Sringeri is 75 km. Direct buses run from Bengaluru to Horanadu every day.
Bus services are provided by both KSRTC and private companies. The nearest airport is Mangalore International Airport previously known as Bajpe airport situated in Mangalore. Mangaluru can be reached via Karkala and Kalasa by road.

Temple

Every visitor to the Annapoorna temple at Horanadu, irrespective of their religion, language, caste, or creed, is provided with a three-course vegetarian meal (including a dessert made from Bele or Lentils). Male visitors to the temple have to remove their shirts and banians (undershirt) and preferably cover their shoulders with a towel or a shawl, as a symbol of respect and humility in front of god.

The main deity, Annapoorneshwari is made of gold. It is believed that a person who seeks the goddess' blessings would never have any scarcity for food in life. It is believed that Lord Shiva once had a curse and that this curse was reversed when the lord visited Goddess Annapoorna and sought her blessings.

Mahamangalarati prayer will be offered every day at 9:00 am, 1:30 pm and at 9:00 pm. Kunkumarchana pooja starts every day at 11:00 am and at 7:00 pm.

The route to the temple traverses through ghats, dense forests and vegetation. A trip to the Horanadu Aadishaktiyatmaka Annapoorneshwari temple would be most fulfilling if all pilgrimage spots en route to the temple are also included in travel plans. Some of the places that will be encountered in that order would be Kukke Subrahmanya, Dharmasthala, Sringeri Sharadhamba temple, Udupi Krishna temple, Kollooru Mookaambike, Kalaseshwara temple in Kalasa, and then the Horanadu Annapoorneshwari temple.

Nearby places 
 Sringeri a famous pilgrim place is located around 61 km from here.
 Famous mountain range in the Western Ghats 'Kuduremukh' is 28 km from Horanadu.
 Kalaseshwara Temple, a famous temple dedicated to Lord Shiva is situated just 6 km from here.
 Gangamula birthplace of 3 famous rivers Tunga, Bhadra and Netravathi is located around 40 km. 
 Hanumanagundi waterfalls is 45 km from here.
  Kyatanmakki Hill View is 10 km from here.
Best time to visit Horanadu is from October to April.

References

External links 

 

Hindu holy cities
Populated places in the Western Ghats
Tourist attractions in Karnataka
Hill stations in Karnataka